Trevor Winter (born January 7, 1974, in Slayton, Minnesota) is an American former professional basketball player who played briefly in the National Basketball Association (NBA).

The 7'0" center from the University of Minnesota played just one game in the NBA. In the lockout-shortened 1999 NBA season for the Minnesota Timberwolves, in five minutes of action against the L.A. Lakers, Winter grabbed three rebounds and committed five fouls (mostly on dominant center Shaquille O'Neal), making him one of three players in NBA history to have as many fouls as career minutes played. Prior to his short NBA career he played in the International Basketball Association for the Fargo-Moorhead Beez.

References

1974 births
Living people
American men's basketball players
Basketball players from Minnesota
Centers (basketball)
La Crosse Bobcats players
Minnesota Golden Gophers men's basketball players
Minnesota Timberwolves players
People from Slayton, Minnesota
Undrafted National Basketball Association players